Simon Korley Martey  (born December 22, 1990) is a Ghanaian football player who plays as a right-back for Cape Coast Ebusua Dwarfs. He previously played for International Allies.

Career
In June 2008 he moved from International Allies F.C. to Asante Kotoko, after 6 months left the club from Accra and signs a contract by Eleven Wise in January 2009. After the bankrupt of Kessben F.C. left the club and signed for Bofoakwa Tano F.C. He played than two years with the team, before signed with Ghana Premier League promoted team Bechem United. Martey played a half year with the Berekum-based club and signed than in summer 2013 with Inter Allies FC. In February 2016, ahead of the 2016 season, Martey was named as the club's assistant captain. He left the club in December 2016, after the expiration of his contract. In 2018, he joined Cape Coast Ebusua Dwarfs.

References

External links

 
 

1990 births
Living people
Ghanaian footballers
Asante Kotoko S.C. players
Sekondi Wise Fighters players
International Allies F.C. players
Bofoakwa Tano F.C. players

Association football wingers
Ghana Premier League players
Ebusua Dwarfs players